Mosaad Megahed (born December 10, 1956 in Alexandria, Egypt) is a German specialist in skin and genital diseases as well as dermatohistology. He is professor and senior physician at the Clinic for Dermatology and Allergology of the University Hospital Aachen. His main focus areas are general dermatology, dermatopathology, autoimmune and hereditary blistering diseases, skin cancer as well as immunological inflammatory skin diseases like atopic dermatitis, collagen diseases, vitiligo and urticaria.

Biography
After Megahed had finished his studies in medicine, he was a resident in the department of Dermatology and Allergology at the University Hospital of the University of Düsseldorf with Gerd Plewig. In 1990 he was recognized as a specialist in skin and genital diseases and one year later he received the additional title allergology. In 1991 Megahed went to the University of Glasgow to join the research team of Rona MacKie. He returned to the University Dermatologic Hospital Düsseldorf as senior physician in the same year. In 1994 he achieved his doctorate in medicine. From 1994 until 1996 Megahed had been completing a research stay at the Thomas Jefferson University in Philadelphia with Jouni Uitto. During that time, he also continued his training in dermatohistology with Bernie Ackerman at the same university. In 1996 he habilitated and received the teaching license at the University of Düsseldorf, where he has been working as professor and senior physician until 2005. In 2005 Megahed changed to the University RWTH Aachen, where he has been professor and senior physician until today. Since 2006, Megahed has the additional title Dermahistology. He also is working as an examiner at the Medical Association North Rhine-Westphalia.

Scientific contribution
 During his research stay at the Thomas Jefferson University in Philadelphia, Megahed and his colleagues identified and cloned a new gene in humans and mice. They named the gene LAD and its produced protein Ladinin (LAD1). The entire sequence of this gene and its protein are registered in the GenBank under the numbers U42408, O00515 U58994, and U58011.
 In 2002 Megahed and his research team showed through immunohistochemistry, that in some cases the tumor melanoma in situ lies deeper in the skin as initially assumed and these cases may metastasize.
 In 2005 Megahed published his monograph about blistering diseases of the skin and mucous membranes.
 In 2008 Megahed cooperated with research teams from different universities and they discovered a new disease with skin alterations, immunodeficiency and RAG mutation.
 In 2014 a doctoral student of Megahed's team could show, that the tumor volume of the melanoma plays a role in the melanoma prognosis.
 Since several years Megahed has been focusing on pathogenesis of therapy resistances in some cases of melanoma and is cooperating with research teams in the USA.

Awards 
In 2003 Megahed and his colleagues received the K.G. Steigleder-Price for the best work on dermahistology by the working group Dermatological Histology (ADH).

Memberships in scientific organizations
Megahed is a member of the German Dermatological Society, German Research Foundation and German Working Group for Dermatohistology, and the European Society of Dermatopathology.

Publications

Books
 M. Megahed: Histopathology of Blistering Diseases: With Clinical, Electron Microscopic, Immunological and Molecular Biological Correlations. Springer Verlag, Berlin/ Heidelberg 2004, .

Articles

Megahed published more than 280 articles in scientific journals (April 2016).

 List of publications ResearchGate
 List of publications Pubmed

References 

German dermatologists
1956 births
Living people
Egyptian emigrants to Germany